Isaiah Thomas (born December 3, 1998) is an American football defensive end for the Cleveland Browns in the National Football League (NFL). He played college football at Oklahoma.

Professional career
Thomas was drafted by the Cleveland Browns with the 223rd overall pick in the seventh round of the 2022 NFL Draft.

References

External links
 Cleveland Browns bio
Oklahoma Sooners bio

1998 births
Living people
Players of American football from Oklahoma
Sportspeople from Tulsa, Oklahoma
American football defensive ends
Oklahoma Sooners football players
Cleveland Browns players